Canton of Sainte-Rose-1 is a canton in the Arrondissement of Basse-Terre on the island of Guadeloupe.

Municipalities
Since the French canton reorganisation which came into effect in March 2015, the communes of the canton are:
 Bouillante (partly)
 Deshaies 
 Pointe-Noire 
 Sainte-Rose (partly)

See also
Cantons of Guadeloupe
Communes of Guadeloupe
Arrondissements of Guadeloupe

References

Sainte-Rose-1